Theresienmesse (H. XXII/12) is a mass in B-flat major written by Joseph Haydn and named after Maria Theresa of the Two Sicilies, empress consort of Francis II.  The empress herself was the soprano soloist at private performances of both The Creation and The Seasons in May 1801 at the Viennese Court. 
The title does not appear on the autograph score, which is labeled simply with the Latin word "Missa".

Between 1796 and 1802, Haydn composed six masses to celebrate the name-day of Princess  (1768-1845), who was the wife of his patron Prince Nikolaus Esterhazy II. The Theresienmesse, written in 1799, belongs in this series.  
The work is thought to have been premiered on 8 September 1799.  The location was the Bergkirche, near the Esterházy family seat in Eisenstadt, Austria.  

The mass is scored for solo quartet, chorus, strings, two clarinets, two trumpets, timpani and organ continuo.  Concerning the paucity of winds (no oboes, bassoons, horns, or flutes) John W. Ehrlich has written:

While probably not as frequently performed as its companions the Nelson Mass or the Missa in tempore belli, the Theresienmesse has attracted critical admiration; Ehrlich for instance refers to it as an "extraordinary work." Another commentator writes, "Haydn's choral writing has all the variety, rhythmic energy and contrapuntal skill of a composer at the height of his powers."

Scoring and structure 

The vocal parts of the mass are performed by four soloists (soprano, alto, tenor and bass) and a four-part choir. The soloists often appear as an ensemble, without arias. Haydn scored the mass for a large orchestra.
 
In the following table of the movements, the markings, keys and time signatures are taken from the choral score, using the symbols for common time and alla breve. The choir is present in all movements, except the Et incarnatus of the Credo.

Notes

External links 
 
 

Masses by Joseph Haydn
Compositions in B-flat major
1799 compositions